Emarid College is a private co-educational Christian institution. Emarid College was founded in September 1992. The school has its campuses in both Port Harcourt city and Igwuruta.

External links

Schools in Port Harcourt
Educational institutions established in 1992
Secondary schools in Rivers State
1992 establishments in Nigeria
1990s establishments in Rivers State